James W. Stone (1813 – October 13, 1854) was a U.S. Representative from Kentucky.

Born in Taylorsville, Kentucky, Stone attended the common schools.
He studied law.
He was admitted to the bar and practiced.
Held several local offices.
He served as member of the State house of representatives in 1837 and 1839.

Stone was elected as a Democrat to the Twenty-eighth Congress (March 4, 1843 – March 3, 1845).
He was an unsuccessful candidate for reelection in 1844 to the Twenty-ninth Congress.

Stone was elected to the Thirty-second Congress (March 4, 1851 – March 3, 1853).
He was an unsuccessful candidate for reelection in 1852 to the Thirty-third Congress.
He died in Taylorsville, Kentucky, October 13, 1854.

References

1813 births
1854 deaths
Democratic Party members of the Kentucky House of Representatives
Democratic Party members of the United States House of Representatives from Kentucky
People from Taylorsville, Kentucky
19th-century American politicians